The Immaculate Conception is the conception of the Virgin Mary free from original sin by virtue of the merits of her son Jesus.

Immaculate Conception may also refer to:

 Feast of the Immaculate Conception, celebrates the belief in the Immaculate Conception of the Blessed Virgin Mary celebrated on December 8
 Immaculate Conception (film), a 1992 film starring James Wilby and Melissa Leo
 The Immaculate Conception (novel), a novel by Gaétan Soucy

Paintings
 Immaculate Conception (Piero di Cosimo), 1485–1505
 Immaculate Conception (Zurbarán), 1632
 The Immaculate Conception (El Greco, Toledo), 1613
 The Immaculate Conception (Tiepolo), 1768

See also
 Church of the Immaculate Conception (disambiguation), churches dedicated to the Immaculate Conception
 Immacolata (disambiguation)
 Immaculata (disambiguation)
 Inmaculada Concepción (disambiguation), churches, schools and institutions dedicated to the Immaculate Conception in Spanish
 La Purísima Concepción (disambiguation)